The Tennessee Titans are a professional American football team based in Nashville, Tennessee. The Titans compete in the National Football League (NFL) as a member club of the American Football Conference (AFC) South division, and play their home games at Nissan Stadium.

Originally known as the Houston Oilers, the team was founded in 1959 by Bud Adams (who remained the owner until his death in 2013), and began play in 1960 in Houston, Texas, as a charter member of the American Football League (AFL). The Oilers won the first two AFL championships along with four division titles, and joined the NFL as part of the AFL–NFL merger in 1970. The Oilers made consecutive playoff appearances from 1978 to 1980 and from 1987 to 1993, with Hall of Famers Earl Campbell and Warren Moon, respectively.

In 1997, the Oilers relocated to Nashville, Tennessee, but played at the Liberty Bowl Memorial Stadium in Memphis for one season while waiting for a new stadium to be constructed. Due to low attendance, the team moved to Nashville's Vanderbilt Stadium in 1998. For those two seasons, the team was known as the Tennessee Oilers, but it changed its name to the Titans for the 1999 season, moving into Adelphia Coliseum (now known as Nissan Stadium). The Titans' training facility is in Saint Thomas Sports Park, a  site at the MetroCenter complex in Nashville.

The Titans have played in the Super Bowl once (XXXIV), losing 23–16 to the St. Louis Rams. Led by Steve McNair and Eddie George, the Titans experienced postseason success during the early 2000s when they made the playoffs in all but one season from 1999 to 2003, but they made the playoffs only twice in the next 13 years. Their fortunes improved in the late 2010s and from 2016 to 2021, with six consecutive winning seasons, the most since they were the Houston Oilers, and four playoff appearances. The Titans are the only NFL team to have two players rush for 2,000 yards in a season: Chris Johnson (2009) and Derrick Henry (2020).

Franchise history

Logos and uniforms

When the team debuted as the Houston Oilers in 1960, its logo was an oil rig derrick. Except for minor color changes throughout the years, this logo remained the same until the team was renamed the Titans in 1999. The logo was originally called "Ol' Riggy", but this name was dropped before the 1974 season.

The Oilers' uniforms consisted of blue or white jerseys, red trim, and white pants. From 1966 to 1971, the pants with both the blue and white jerseys were silver to match the color of the helmets. The team commonly wore light blue pants on the road with the white jerseys from 1972 to 1994, with the exception of the 1980 season, and selected games in the mid-1980s, when the team wore an all-white road combination. For selected games in 1973 and 1974, and again from 1981 through 1984, the Oilers wore their white jerseys at home. Coach Jeff Fisher discarded the light blue pants in 1995. From 1960 to about 1965 and from 1972 to 1974, the Oilers wore blue helmets; the helmets were silver from 1966 to 1971 and white from 1975 to 1998.

From 1997 to 1998, when it was known as the Tennessee Oilers, the team had an alternate logo that combined elements of the flag of Tennessee with the derrick. The team also wore its white uniforms during home games as opposed to their time in Houston, when it wore its blue uniforms at home. In its two years as the Tennessee Oilers, the team wore its colored jerseys only twice: for road games against the Miami Dolphins and a Thanksgiving Day game against the Dallas Cowboys. It wore all white exclusively in its last year as the Tennessee Oilers.

When the team was renamed the Titans in 1999, it introduced a new logo: a circle with three stars representing the state's Grand Divisions, similar to that found on the flag of Tennessee, containing a large "T" with a trail of flames similar to a comet. The uniforms consisted of white helmets, red trim, and either navy or white jerseys. White pants were normally worn with the navy jerseys, and navy pants with the white jerseys. On both the navy and white jerseys, the outside shoulders and sleeves were light Titans blue. In a game against the Washington Redskins on October 15, 2006, the Titans wore their navy jerseys with navy pants for the first time. Since 2000, the Titans have generally worn their dark uniforms at home throughout the preseason and regular season. They have worn white at home during daytime contests on many occasions for September home games to gain an advantage with the heat, except in the 2005, 2006 and 2008 seasons.

In 2003, the Titans introduced an alternate jersey that was light Titans blue with navy outside shoulders and sleeves, which was usually worn with the road blue pants. Until 2007, they wore the jersey twice in each regular-season game (and once in the preseason). They always wore the Titans blue jersey in their annual divisional game against the Houston Texans and for other selected home games which came mostly against a team from the old AFL (American Football League). Their selection in those games was representative of the organization's ties to Houston and the old AFL. On November 19, 2006, the Titans introduced light Titans blue pants, reminiscent of the Oilers', in a game against the Philadelphia Eagles. In December 2006, they combined the Titans blue pants with the Titans blue jersey to create an all Titans blue uniform; Vince Young appeared in this uniform in the cover art for Madden NFL 08.

During the 2006 season, the Titans wore seven different uniform combinations, pairing the white jersey with all three sets of pants (white, Titans blue, navy blue), the navy jersey with the white and navy pants, and the Titans blue jersey with navy and Titans blue pants. In a game against the Atlanta Falcons on October 7, 2007, the Titans paired the navy blue jersey with the Titans blue pants for the first time. They also wore the navy blue jerseys with the light blue pants against the Tampa Bay Buccaneers. The team paired the Titans blue jerseys with the white pants for the first time in a home game against the Indianapolis Colts on November 14, 2013. In 2008, the Titans blue jerseys became the regular home uniforms, with the navy blue jerseys being relegated to alternate status but not worn until 2013.

In 2009, the NFL and the Hall of Fame committee announced that the Titans and the Buffalo Bills would begin the 2009 NFL preseason in the Hall of Fame Game. The game, played at Canton's Pro Football Hall of Fame Field at Fawcett Stadium on August 9, 2009, was nationally televised on NBC. The Titans defeated the Bills, 21–18. In honor of the AFL's 50th anniversary, the Titans wore Oilers' uniforms for this game. Also in 2009, the team honored former quarterback Steve McNair by placing a small, navy blue disc on the back of their helmets with a white number nine inside of it (nine was the number McNair wore during his time with the Oilers/Titans).

From 2009 to 2012, the Titans did not wear an alternate jersey during any regular-season games. It was not until 2013 that the team wore the navy blue jerseys twice in honor of their 15th anniversary as the Titans. The Titans wore white jerseys for all games in 2014, for the exceptions of two preseason home games, in which the team wore their light Titans blue jerseys, and a game against the Houston Texans on October 26, 2014, in which the Titans wore their navy blue uniforms.

Beginning in 2015, navy blue became the team's primary home jersey color again, marking the first time since 2007 that the Titans wore navy as their primary home jersey, though the team plans to continue wearing white jerseys for early-season hot-weather home games. The light Titans blue jersey, which was the team's primary jersey color from 2008 to 2014, became the team's alternate jersey for a second time.

On April 4, 2018, the Titans debuted new uniforms at an event attended by over 10,000 fans in downtown Nashville. The uniforms retain the color palette of navy blue, Titans blue and white, with new red and silver elements being introduced. The new helmets are navy blue with one silver sword-shaped stripe through the center and metallic gray facemasks, a change from the previous white helmets with two navy stripes and black facemasks.

Rivals
The Titans share rivalries with their three AFC South opponents (Jacksonville Jaguars, Houston Texans, and Indianapolis Colts). They also have historical rivalries with former divisional opponents such as the Pittsburgh Steelers, Baltimore Ravens (formerly the original Cleveland Browns) and Buffalo Bills, and during their time as the Houston Oilers, shared an in-state rivalry with the Dallas Cowboys.

Divisional rivalries

Jacksonville Jaguars

Since their founding, the Jaguars have been seen from time to time as the Titans' primary rival due to constantly competitive games between the two franchises. The rivalry began back in 1995 when the Titans were still called the Houston Oilers. The rivalry was heated in the late 1990s and early 2000s due to the success of both franchises at the time, including a season in which Jacksonville went 14-2 and Tennessee went 13–3. That season, all three of Jacksonville's losses (including the playoffs) came against the Titans, who went on to play in Super Bowl XXXIV. The rivalry then cooled with both teams experiencing misfortune in the late 2000s to early 2010s, but both teams ended lengthy playoff droughts in 2017.

Houston Texans

The Texans see the Titans as their primary rival due to the Titans' previous history in Houston until their relocation to Tennessee. The Titans dominated the rivalry in the early 2000s, but the series has since evened out in the 2010s.

Indianapolis Colts
From the early 2000s to the late 2010s, the Colts have been very dominant in their rivalry with the Titans since the creation of the AFC South, with quarterbacks Peyton Manning and later Andrew Luck leading the Colts to consistent success against the Titans, though the Titans would find a decent amount of success in the 2000s, and the rest of the division. However, the series has become more even as of late, with the Titans sweeping the Colts in 2017 after 11 straight losses. In the recent years, the rivalry has picked up steam as both the Titans and the Colts have got playoff teams and compete for the AFC South title.  In 2018, the Colts defeated the Titans in Nashville the last game of the regular season to clinch the final Wild Card spot, while eliminating Tennessee from playoff contention. In 2020, the Titans came out as the 2020 AFC South champions over the Colts due to tiebreaking measures as both finished 11–5.

Other rivalries

Buffalo Bills

As the Houston Oilers, the team was first in the same division as the Buffalo Bills in the days of the AFL, but were moved to the AFC Central division following the NFL-AFL merger. Even after the Bills and Oilers were placed in separate divisions following the merger, their rivalry remained strong into the 1980s and 1990s with Warren Moon leading the Oilers up against Jim Kelly and the Bills. Two of the most iconic playoff moments in Oilers/Titans history have occurred against the Bills: the Comeback (known as "the Choke" in Houston due to the team's historic collapse against the Bills) and the Music City Miracle, which occurred after the team moved to Nashville to become the Titans. The Bills and Titans were later featured in an "AFL legacy" game in 2009, as part of festivities commemorating the 50th anniversary of the AFL's foundation. Titans owner Bud Adams was fined $250,000 by the league following the 41-17 Titans win in which he obscenely gestured towards the Bills sideline, as he and Bills owner Ralph Wilson had maintained a friendly rivalry and were the last living original AFL owners at that time (Adams and Wilson would die in 2013 and 2014, respectively). Since 2018, the rivalry has heated up again due to the recurrent success of both teams.

Pittsburgh Steelers

After the move to the AFC Central division, they developed a strong rivalry with the Pittsburgh Steelers. The Steelers were the Oilers' primary divisional rival and to this date, the Titans have played them more than any other NFL team. The Steelers and Oilers were competitive in the 1970s, facing off in back-to-back AFC championship games towards the end of the decade. The teams both underwent hard times in the 1980s before re-emerging in the 1990s. After the Oilers' move to Tennessee and the re-alignment of the NFL's divisions in 2002, the Steelers-Titans rivalry has cooled somewhat.

Baltimore Ravens

In the late 1990s and early 2000s after becoming the Titans, they had a briefly intense rivalry with the Baltimore Ravens, which flared up again when former Titans quarterback Steve McNair went to the Ravens. Following the realignment of the NFL's divisions in 2002, the rivalry with the Ravens cooled off somewhat, though the Titans have faced off against Baltimore five times in the postseason, most recently in the 2020–21 NFL playoffs, in which they lost to the 5th seeded Ravens 20–13.

Culture

Flameheads
During the Titans' first season in their new stadium, the end zone sections became known as the Flame Pit and fans began wearing headwear resembling flames. Called "Flameheads," the costumes became very prevalent during the Titans' successful years of the early 2000s. Flames in general are heavily tied to the organization because in Greek Mythology, the Titan Prometheus stole fire and gave it to humanity.

Cheerleaders and mascot
Tennessee's cheerleading squad is called the Tennessee Titans Cheerleaders and represent the team in the NFL. They perform at every home game in Nissan Stadium and regularly do acts with the team's mascot T-Rac. They currently have 28 members, including nine men, with four captains. They perform a variety of dance moves and include high-risk stunts. They also attend several community events in Middle Tennessee. While the franchise was the Houston Oilers, the squad was called the Derrick Dolls.

T-Rac is the raccoon mascot of the Titans, debuting in the team's inaugural preseason home game in August 1999 against the Atlanta Falcons. The raccoon is the state animal of Tennessee. T-Rac also appears at every game in Nissan Stadium and does community events all throughout Tennessee. He has also zip-lined from the top of the stadium and rappelled from buildings in downtown Nashville.

Stadium traditions
During every home game's 4th quarter, the stadium plays a video of "office linebacker" Terry Tate, performed by Lester Speight, shouting his catchphrase, "the pain train's coming!" This is immediately followed by the playing of "Folsom Prison Blues" by Johnny Cash, a favorite singer of Nashville.

After every Titans first down at Nissan Stadium, the jumbotrons play a scene from the movie 300 where the Spartans chant after King Leonidas asks, "What is your profession?" Titans fans simultaneously perform the chant three times, "HA-OOH! HA-OOH! HA-OOH!" The chant debuted in video game form in Madden NFL 22.

Season-by-season records

Player information

Current roster

Retired numbers

Pro Football Hall of Fame members

Texas Sports Hall of Fame

Titans Ring of Honor
In 1999, owner Bud Adams established a Titans/Oilers Hall of Fame after the 40th season of the franchise to honor past players and management. It was then changed to Titans Ring of Honor in the 2010s. Bum Phillips, Jeff Fisher, and Floyd Reese are the most recent inductees, each in 2021 (September 26 for Phillips, November 21 for the latter two).

Franchise leaders
Bold denotes still active with team

Italics denote still active but not with team

Passing yards (regular season) (as of end of 2021 season)

 1. Warren Moon (33,685)
 2. Steve McNair (27,141)
 3. George Blanda (19,149)
 4. Dan Pastorini (16,864)
 5. Marcus Mariota (13,207)
 6. Ryan Tannehill (12,831)
 7. Vince Young (8,098)
 8. Kerry Collins (6,804)
 9. Ken Stabler (5,190)
 10. Pete Beathard (5,128)

 11. Jake Locker (4,967)
 12. Matt Hasselbeck (4,938)
 13. Chris Chandler (4,559)
 14. Cody Carlson (4,469)
 15. Don Trull (3,538)
 16. Billy Volek (3,505)
 17. Jacky Lee (3,291)
 18. Gifford Nielsen (3,255)
 19. Neil O'Donnell (2,664)
 20. Oliver Luck (2,544)

 21. Ryan Fitzpatrick (2,454)
 22. Zach Mettenberger (2,347)
 23. Charley Johnson (2,244)
 24. Lynn Dickey (1,953)
 25. Archie Manning (1,632)
 26. Charlie Whitehurst (1,326)
 27. Billy Joe Tolliver (1,287)
 28. Bucky Richardson (1,257)
 29. Jerry Rhome (1,031)
 30. Brent Pease (792)

Rushing yards (regular season) (as of end of 2021 season)

 1. Eddie George (10,009)
 2. Earl Campbell (8,574)
 3. Derrick Henry (8,335)
 4. Chris Johnson (7,965)
 5. Lorenzo White (4,079)
 6. Hoyle Granger (3,514)
 7. Steve McNair (3,439)
 8. Mike Rozier (3,426)
 9. Charley Tolar (3,277)
 10. Ronnie Coleman (2,769)

 11. Chris Brown (2,757)
 12. LenDale White (2,349)
 13. Allen Pinkett (2,324)
 14. Gary Brown	(2,115)
 15. Fred Willis	(2,114)
 16. Billy Cannon	(2,111)
 17. DeMarco Murray (1,946)
 18. Rodney Thomas	(1,847)
 19. Rob Carpenter	(1,788)
 20. Larry Moriarty (1,624)

 21. Travis Henry	(1,546)
 22. Warren Moon (1,541)
 23. Woody Campbell (1,493)
 24. Marcus Mariota (1,399)
 25. Tim Wilson (1,385)
 26. Vince Young (1,380)
 27. Dave Smith (1,368)
 28. Sid Blanks (1,366)
 29. Alonzo Highsmith (1,103)
 30. Ode Burrell (1,088)

Receiving yards (regular season) (as of end of 2021 season)

 1. Ernest Givens (7,935)
 2. Drew Hill (7,477)
 3. Ken Burrough (6,906)
 4. Charley Hennigan (6,823)
 5. Haywood Jeffires (6,119)
 6. Derrick Mason (6,114)
 7. Frank Wycheck (4,958)
 8. Nate Washington (4,591)
 9. Delanie Walker (4,423)
 10. Drew Bennett (4,033)

 11. Curtis Duncan (3,935)
 12. Chris Sanders (3,285)
 13. Kendall Wright (3,244)
 14. Tim Smith (3,107)
 15. Charley Frazier (3,060)
 16. A. J. Brown (2,995)
 17. Bill Groman (2,976)
 18. Corey Davis (2,851)
 19. Alvin Reed (2,818)
 20. Kenny Britt (2,450)

 21. Bo Scaife (2,383)
 22. Kevin Dyson (2,310)
 23. Webster Slaughter (2,236)
 24. Mike Renfro (2,183)
 25. Billy Johnson (2,149)
 26. Eddie George (2,144)
 27. Willard Dewveall (2,080)
 28. Justin Gage (2,050)
 29. Chris Johnson (2,003)
 30. Bob McLeod (1,926)

Coaching staff

Head coaches

Current staff

Radio and television

The flagship radio station of the Titans Radio Network for several years was WKDF 103.3-FM. However WGFX 104.5-FM, the original Tennessee Oilers/Titans Radio flagship station, again serves as the Titans Radio flagship station since the 2010 season. Mike Keith is the team's play-by-play announcer, and former Titans assistant coach Dave McGinnis (head coach of the Arizona Cardinals from 2000 to 2003) provides color commentary during games. Previous to McGinnis, former Titans tight end Frank Wycheck provided the color commentary. Larry Stone is also a part of the team, providing injury and scoring updates. The Titans Radio Network is broadcast on some 70 other stations.

The team had long resisted placing any of its games on Sirius XM Radio. According to the Titans Radio Network, this was because the Titans' contract with Citadel Broadcasting (parent of both WKDF and WGFX) predated the arrival of satellite radio, thus there was no provision for the NFL to reserve satellite-radio rights. In 2011, the Titans were able to extend their agreement with existing radio partners while creating a provision allowing home games to be broadcast on SiriusXM. They were the final team in the NFL to reach such a deal.

Most preseason games are televised on Nexstar station WKRN-TV, the ABC affiliate in Nashville, along with a weekly Tuesday night coach's show, The Mike Vrabel Show, formerly known as Titans on 2. The preseason games are distributed through a network made up of other Nexstar stations throughout the state and several affiliates where Nexstar has no stations.

For regular season games, WTVF, the CBS affiliate for Nashville, airs the most games due to its AFC-centric rights. Fox affiliate WZTV carries home games against NFC opponents (along with select flexed games and Thursday Night Football), NBC affiliate WSMV-TV has Sunday Night Football broadcasts, and WKRN carries the team's Monday Night Football matchups locally.

Radio affiliates

See also
List of American Football League players
NFL Cheerleading

References

External links

 
 Tennessee Titans at the National Football League official website

 
 
American Football League teams
National Football League teams
American football teams in Nashville, Tennessee
American football teams established in 1960
1999 establishments in Tennessee